Radiophronidae is an extinct family of wasps known from two genera found in Cretaceous (Albian) aged amber from Spain. While originally classified in Ceraphronoidea, they were later considered to probably be members of Chrysidoidea.

References 

Chrysidoidea